The Men's Overall in the 2023 FIS Alpine Skiing World Cup is currently scheduled to consist of 38 events in four disciplines: downhill (DH) (10 races), Super-G (SG) (8 races), giant slalom (GS) (10 races), and slalom (SL) (10 races). The fifth and sixth disciplines, parallel (PAR). and Alpine combined (AC), have had all events in the 2022–23 season cancelled, either due to the schedule disruption cased by the COVID-19 pandemic (AC) or due to bad weather (PAR). The original calendar contained 43 events, but in addition to the parallel, four downhills have been cancelled over the course of the season.

The season was interrupted by the 2023 World Ski Championships in the linked resorts of Courchevel and Méribel, France, which are located in Les Trois Vallées, from 6–19 February 2023. During the world championships, Norwegian star Atle Lie McGrath, who currently was in 11th place overall, fell during the Super-G and suffered a ACL tear, which required season-ending surgery.

Season Summary
From the very first race of the season, defending champion Marco Odermatt of Switzerland seized the lead in the standings due to his abilities in all disciplines except for slalom. After the first fifteen races, he had built a lead of over 300 points over speed specialist Aleksander Aamodt Kilde of Norway.  However, after Odermatt was injured during a downhill at Kitzbühel on 20 January and had to miss the following few races, Kilde was able to draw within 200 points by 25 January. However, Odermatt won the next two races to push his lead back over 300 points. 

When Kilde did not enter the two giant slaloms in Kranjska Gora, Slovenia on 11-12 March, Odermatt clinched the season championship due to holding a lead of over 400 points, while the maximum points potentially available to Kilde were only 400. But after winning both races, Odermatt entered the World Cup finals needing just 174 points from his three specialties to surpass Hermann Maier's men's all-time points record of 2,000 in one season, set in the 2000 season and only surpassed so far by two women: Tina Maze in 2013 and Mikaela Shiffrin in 2019 and this year. In his first two races during the finals, Odermatt finished 15th in downhill (16 points) and won the Super-G (100 points), leaving him just 58 points short of Maier's record; a finish of third or better in the giant slalom would give Odermatt the record. He then won the giant slalom (by 2.11 seconds!) to set a new Men's World Cup points record of 2,042 points.

The victory also enabled Odermatt to tie the men's record of 13 victories in a season on the World Cup circuit, a record Odermatt now shares with Maier (2001), Ingemar Stenmark (1979), and Marcel Hirscher (2018) -- and behind only two women: Shiffrin (17 wins in 2019; 14 wins this year) and Vreni Schneider (14 wins in 1989).

Finals
The last events of the season took place at the World Cup finals, Wednesday, 15 March 2023 through Sunday, 19 March 2023 in Soldeu, Andorra. Only the top 25 in each specific discipline for the season and the winner of the Junior World Championship in each discipline were eligible to compete in the finals, with the exception that any skier who has scored at least 500 points in the overall classification was eligible to participate in any discipline, regardless of his standing in that discipline for the season.

Standings

See also
 2023 Alpine Skiing World Cup – Men's summary rankings
 2023 Alpine Skiing World Cup – Men's Downhill
 2023 Alpine Skiing World Cup – Men's Super-G
 2023 Alpine Skiing World Cup – Men's Giant Slalom
 2023 Alpine Skiing World Cup – Men's Slalom
 2023 Alpine Skiing World Cup – Women's Overall
 World Cup scoring system

References

External links
 Alpine Skiing at FIS website

Men's overall
FIS Alpine Ski World Cup overall titles